2002 LG Cup may refer to:
2002 LG Cup (Morocco), an exhibition association football tournament, 1–3 March in Casablanca
2002 LG Cup (Russia), an exhibition association football tournament, 17–19 May in Moscow
2002 LG Cup (Iran), an exhibition association football tournament, 17–19 September in Tabriz
2002 LG Cup (snooker), the World Open, 5–13 October in Preston, England